Euphorbia commutata, the tinted woodland spurge, is an annual plant in the family Euphorbiaceae. It is native to Eastern North America where it is found in rich, calcareous forests and rock outcrops. It has small green flowers in the spring, so it is easily overlooked.

Two varieties of Euphorbia commutata are sometimes recognized. These are: 
Euphorbia commutata var. commutata 
Euphorbia commutata var. erecta

References

Flora of North America
commmutata